The Football League Third Division was the third tier of the English football league system in 1920–21 and again from 1958 until 1992. When the FA Premier League was formed, the Third Division become the fourth tier of English football. In 2004, following the formation of the Football League Championship, the division was renamed Football League Two.

Founder clubs of the Third Division (1920)
Most of these clubs were drawn from what was then the top division of the 1919–20 Southern Football League, in an expansion of the Football League south of Birmingham. As Cardiff City was long considered a potential entrant for the Second Division due to their FA Cup exploits and Southern League dominance, they were sent directly into the Second Division and Grimsby Town, who finished in last place in the Second Division in 1919–20, were relegated.

 Brentford 
 Brighton & Hove Albion 
 Bristol Rovers 
 Crystal Palace (inaugural champions in 1920–21)
 Exeter City 
 Gillingham 
 Grimsby Town
 Luton Town 
 Merthyr Town
 Millwall 
 Newport County 
 Northampton Town 
 Norwich City 
 Plymouth Argyle 
 Portsmouth 
 Queens Park Rangers
 Reading
 Southampton
 Southend United 
 Swansea Town 
 Swindon Town 
 Watford

The split Third Divisions
This league continued in 1921–22 as Football League Third Division South whilst the Football League Third Division North was formed with the Northern clubs, the two Divisions jointly forming the third tier.

Geographical separation was abolished in 1958 with the creation of the Football League Fourth Division.

As a single Third Division
The original members in 1958–59 were:
 From Third Division North: Accrington Stanley, Bradford City, Bury, Chesterfield, Halifax Town, Hull City, Mansfield Town, Rochdale, Stockport County, Tranmere Rovers, Wrexham
 From Third Division South: Bournemouth, Brentford, Colchester United, Newport County, Norwich City, Plymouth Argyle, Queens Park Rangers, Reading, Southampton, Southend United, Swindon Town
 Relegated from Second Division: Doncaster Rovers, Notts County

Of these, Bournemouth, Bradford, Brentford, Hull, Norwich, Notts, QPR, Reading, Southampton, and Swindon have made the top flight in either the First Division or the Premier League era. Stockport, Doncaster, Notts County and Rochdale were the first to be relegated into the Fourth Division the following season (1959–60), starting the bottom-four-team turnover tradition for the third tier. As with the Second Division, the champion and runner-up were automatically promoted; the third place was also promoted automatically beginning in 1974. Play-offs for the third promotion place were introduced in 1987. AFC Bournemouth, formerly Bournemouth & Boscombe Athletic, hold the record as the club to have spent most time in this Division.

The Third Division of English football lasted for a total of 72 years, the first 38 years as two regionalised divisions (although just 31 seasons were played due to the advent of World War II) before a 34-year run as a national division. Plymouth Argyle were the most successful team at this level during these years, winning the national title twice, having already won the southern section twice.

In 1992 the FA Premier League started and the Football League was reduced in numbers, leading to the Third Division becoming the fourth tier. See Football League One for subsequent third-tier history.

Winners of the Third Division
See List of winners of English Football League One and predecessors for winners before 1992 and List of winners of English Football League Two and predecessors for winners afterwards.

References

 
3
Eng
Eng